The 2010-11 Turkish Basketball League was the 45th season of the top professional basketball league in Turkey.In the 2010–2011 season Fenerbahçe Ülker had won the Turkish Basketball League .

Clubs and arenas 

The league consists of the following member clubs:

RS = Regular season / QF = Quarter-finals / SF = Semi-finals / RU = Runners-up

League table

Playoffs

References

External links 
 Official Site 
 TBLStat.net History Page

Turkish Basketball Super League seasons
Turkish
1